In molecular biology, the Norovirus cis-acting replication element (CRE) is an RNA element which is found in the coding region of the RNA-dependent RNA polymerase in Norovirus. It occurs near to the 5′ end of the RNA dependant RNA polymerase gene, this is the same location that the Hepatitis A virus cis-acting replication element is found in.

See also 
Cis-regulatory element
Regulation of gene expression

References

Norovirus
Non-coding RNA